Nolan Hoffman (born 23 April 1985) is a South African road and track cyclist, who currently rides for South African team Enza. He was suspended for eighteen months after he tested positive for the use of testosterone on 18 October 2009. He competed in the scratch event at the UCI Track Cycling World Championships in 2012, 2013 and 2014, winning the silver medal in 2012.

Major results

2005
 1st Stage 3 (TTT) Tour d'Egypte
2007
 5th Road race, African Road Championships
2008
 1st Powerade Dome 2 Dome Cycling Spectacular
 4th Overall Tour de Korea
1st Stage 9
2009
 1st Stage 1 Tour de Korea
 3rd Giro del Capo IV
2011
 All-Africa Games
1st  Road race
1st  Team time trial (with Jay Thomson, Reinardt Janse van Rensburg and Darren Lill)
2012
 2nd  Scratch, UCI Track Cycling World Championships
2014
 1st Cape Town Cycle Tour
 1st Points classification Mzansi Tour
2015
 1st Cape Town Cycle Tour
 KZN Autumn Series
8th Mayday Classic
10th PMB Road Classic
2018
 1st 100 Cycle Challenge
 1st Cape Town Cycle Tour
 3rd Road race, National Road Championships
2019
 Tour of Good Hope
1st Points classification
1st Stage 1
 3rd 100 Cycle Challenge
2021
 1st Cape Town Cycle Tour

References

External links

1985 births
Living people
South African track cyclists
South African male cyclists
People from Stellenbosch Local Municipality
Doping cases in cycling
African Games gold medalists for South Africa
African Games medalists in cycling
Competitors at the 2011 All-Africa Games
20th-century South African people
21st-century South African people